The following is a list of characters from the Yu-Gi-Oh! anime series, Yu-Gi-Oh! Sevens.

Characters

Main Characters

An enthusiastic fifth grader that tinkers with machines and makes up new rules, which applies to the making of Rush Duels. He became the true King of Duels.
Lucidien "Luke" Kallister / 

An aspiring lad, who aims to become the "King of Duels" by partaking in Yuga's Rush Duels. He has an alleged "power" that triggers a Pauli effect, causing machinery to temporarily shut down.
Gavin Sogetsu / 

An adamant, disciplined member of the student council of Goha 7th Elementary.
Romin Kassidy / 

A guitarist of the "RoaRomin" band, who takes an interest in duelling after receiving a card from a musician she admires.
Roa Kassidy / 

Romin's cousin and leader of the "RoaRomin" band.
Nail Saionji / 

The overseer of Goha Duels, and steals the data of Kaizo to aid in his efforts to erase Rush Dueling. He is also the first known person to Maximum Summon.

The heir to the Mutsuba Heavy Machinery company, which helped construct Goha City, and the leader of the Heavy Cavalry Duel Club, to the extent that she has power over the entire school.

Goha 7th Elementary
Rayne Nanahoshi / 

The student council vice president who assists Gavin with the student council's duties and enforces discipline at Goha 7th. She's in love with Yuga Ohdo.
Ricky / 

One of Yuga's friends.

One of Yuga's friends.
Scoop Pitman / 

The Newspaper Club's head.
Masa / 

The Newspaper Club's interviewer.

The Newspaper Club's photographer.
Yosh Imimi / 

Mimi's son and though he loves Rush Duels, this brings him into conflict with his mother.
Tiadosia "Tiger" Kallister / 

Lucidien's older sister, and the president of the Concert Band Club. She's Asana's childhood friend.

Goha 3rd Elementary
Saburamen / 

A fifth grader from Goha 3rd Elementary who loves ramen and dreams of creating new rules that fuse ramen and Dueling together one day.
Buff Grimes / 

The leader of the Washing Club. He works for Nail Saionji and he's the weakest member of the Garden of Curiosity.

Goha 2nd Elementary
Professor Diggs / 

A sixth grader at Goha 2nd Elementary and the Dueling & Dinosaur Research Club president.
Tracker / 

A student at Goha 2nd Elementary and a member of the Dueling & Dinosaur Research Club.
Trench / 

A student at Goha 2nd Elementary, and is the Dueling & Dinosaur Research Club vice-chairman.

Goha Aquatic Elementary
Skipjack / 

The captain of the Goha Aquatic Elementary ship and a Fisherman Duelist.

Goha 6th Elementary
Galian Townsend / 

The tactical advisor of the Heavy Cavalry Duel Club.
Schubel Quill / 

A member of the Heavy Cavalry Duel Club, and is constantly accompanied by Pidgetrap, his pet pigeon.
Pidgetrap / 
Schubel's pet pigeon and is considered a Tactical Advisor of Goha 6th Elementary's Heavy Cavalry Duel Club.
Janko Entant / 

The former president of the Student Council at Goha 6th Elementary, who holds the "Dark Rush Duel Tournament" in defiance of the Heavy Cavalry Duel Club's stance on Rush Duels.
Terra Kneadalina / 

An "assassin" who works for Goha 6th Elementary's Heavy Cavalry Duel Club, though she claims to be from the Shiatsu Nether-Empire.
Caterpillio Elephantis / 

The mechanic of Goha 6th Elementary's Heavy Cavalry Duel Club.

She works with Jango and Genri in the Student Council.

Goha 5th Elementary
Kit Schrödinger / 

He works for Nail Saionji and is the president of the Duel Mad Scientists.
Booster Page / 

The president of the Duelstronauts.
Lionel Alec / 

A member of the Duelstronauts.
Valencia Siegel / 

A member of the Duelstronauts.

Rayne and Rino's cousin, she is the President of the Dueling Insects Club, and she's Yuga Ohdo's childhood friend.

Goha 4th Elementary

A student at Goha 4th Elementary and the President of the Zombie Duel Club.

Goha Enterprises

The mysterious president of Goha Enterprises and subsequently the de facto ruler of Goha City. The stress of his job eventually gets to him, and he is discarded by the President Drone.

It assists President Goha in running the Goha Corporation, as it has done with many past presidents of the company. It was created to help the substitute Goha President while the Goha 6 were in space.
Mimi Imimi / 

The Number 6 among the "Top of the Hexagon", the six executives of the Goha Enterprises, and she is sent to Goha #7 Elementary undercover as a transfer student to investigate Rush Dueling. Mimi aspires to ascend to the rank of Goha President. Mimi is demoted for her failure to keep her fellow Tops in check when they attempted to fire Nail. However, she discovers the Goha President after he collapses and becomes the new President after being chosen by the President Drone. She is evicted from her position after the return of the Goha 6. In the end of the series, she becomes the Vice-President of Goha Enterprises.
Goha Corporation Drone

Machines which control the duel rules. They have different colors and shapes.

An official who works in the Development Department of Goha Corp where he created Sevens Roads series and gave them to Yuga when he was a child. He formed a faction with Celestia Noodlina, Terra Kneedalina, Prioria Sweedalina, Oceania Illumilina, Hire Yureiko, Konvoy Sagawa, and President Drone.
Seatbastian / 

A Goha Corporation Drone, specifically a massage chair drone, who serves as Nail's butler and throne. After Nail was defeated, he was assigned to aid Yuga and his friends. Nail fixed him after his duel with Terra Kneedalina.
Prioria Sweetalina / 

She resembles Celestia and Terra, and claims to have come from an ancient civilization, though she works as an announcer for the Goha Corporation during the Goha Rush Duel Team Battle Royal, though her true masters are Goha 66.

He leads the organization of the same name; Goha 66, and is plotting to take control of the Goha Corporation.
Oceania Illumilina / 

She resembles Celestia, Terra, and Prioria; she replaces the latter as an announcer for the Goha Rush Duel Team Battle Royal after her departure back to the past.

A Turbo Duelist and the eldest of the Goha 6. He also one of the six true presidents of Goha Corporation and a student of Goha Space Elementary.

He describes himself as a "Maritime Duelist" and he is the second-eldest of the Goha 6. He is also one of the six true presidents of Goha Corporation and a student of Goha Space Elementary.

He is described as the most mysterious and reserved member of the Goha Siblings and is the third-eldest. He is also one of the six true presidents of Goha Corporation and a student of Goha Space Elementary.

 
The only female member of the Goha 6. She is also one of the six true presidents of Goha Corporation and a student of Goha Space Elementary.

One of the Goha 6, and the one who set in motion the plan to challenge Yuga and his friends to Duels by holding the Super Rush Robot hostage, though he also has his own goals behind the scenes. He is also one of the six true presidents of Goha Corporation and a student of Goha Space Elementary.

 
One of the Goha 6 and the most dangerous to the point that Yuo sealed his memories when he attempted to take over the world, becoming a shy boy in a chameleon suit named , who became a member of the Rush Duel Club. However, Swirls returned to his former self and resumes his place as one of the six true presidents of Goha Corporation.

Goha City

A 'road' that Yuga Ohdo has invented after modifying a Goha Corp Drone.
Gwendoline Purdy / Gibumi Purisaki

Toombs / 

The bassist of RoaRomin.
Tyler Getz / 

The drummer of RoaRomin and Roa Kassidy's childhood friend.
Briscoe / 

A friend of Saburamen.

A friend of Saburamen.
Celestia Noodlina / 

A petite young girl who works at a ramen store in the Garden of Curiosity and claims to be an alien from the Menmen system of the Ra Nebula.

References

Sevens Characters
Yu-Gi-Oh Sevens